Disney Presents The 100 Lives of Black Jack Savage is an American fantasy comedy-drama television series broadcast in the United States by NBC and produced by Stephen J. Cannell Productions in association with Walt Disney Television. The show originated as a television movie.  The program originally aired from March 31 to May 26, 1991, and lasted less than one season.

Plot
The series followed the story of Black Jack Savage (Steven Williams), the ghost of a legendary 17th-century Caribbean pirate who teams up with Barry Tarberry (Daniel Hugh Kelly), a crooked Wall Street con artist who has escaped trial by coming to the Caribbean. Facing eternal damnation, both of them discover that they need to save 100 lives to compensate for the damage done by their sinful lives, and thus save their own souls.

Any time Black Jack tries to leave the safety of his castle haunt on San Pietro Island, he is fair game for the "snarks". They are entities that can transport Jack to Hell through an entrance at the base of the tree where he was originally hanged. Tarberry has his own difficulties dodging the government agents sent to extradite him back to the United States to stand trial for his crimes. Other characters on San Pietro include the corrupt governor-general, Abel Vasquez (Bert Rosario), with whom Tarberry is able to make another deal, and island activist Danielle (Roma Downey), who is constantly trying to help protect the locals from the effects of Vasquez's corruption and is not above enlisting Tarberry's help in doing so.

The show follows the misadventures of both Black Jack and his human counterpart as they team up to dodge the law, both supernatural and secular, to make their 100 soul quota and thus win their way to salvation. Each episode ended with a graphic telling the viewers "??? Lives To Go..."

Blackbird powerboat 

A regular part of every episode was an appearance of the high tech powerboat. Built by scientist/inventor Logan "FX" Murphy (played by Steve Hytner), the Blackbird was a black trimaran speedboat that resembled a SR-71 reconnaissance plane. It was originally commissioned by the previous owner of Blackbird Castle, a drug runner. After his arrest, Tarberry took possession of the Blackbird from Murphy. When not in use, the Blackbird was moored at a secret dock at Blackbird Castle on San Pietro Island.

Cast
Stoney Jackson as Black Jack Savage (pilot episode)
Steven Williams as Black Jack Savage (series)
Roma Downey as Danielle
Daniel Hugh Kelly as Barry Tarberry
Bert Rosario as Abel Vasquez
Steve Hytner as Logan "FX" Murphy

Episodes

Notes

References

External links
  (Pilot film)
  (Series)

1990s American comedy-drama television series
1991 American television series debuts
1991 American television series endings
English-language television shows
NBC original programming
Television series by Disney
Television series by Stephen J. Cannell Productions
Television shows set in Florida
Television shows filmed in Florida